Scarlet Nexus is an action role-playing game developed by Bandai Namco Studios and Tose and published by Bandai Namco Entertainment. It was released on June 25, 2021, for PlayStation 4, PlayStation 5, Windows, Xbox One and Xbox Series X and Series S. The game received generally positive reviews from critics, with praise for the combat but criticism for its side missions. It sold 1 million units by April 2022.

Gameplay
Scarlet Nexus is an action role-playing game played from a third-person perspective. Players can assume control of either Yuito Sumeragi or Kasane Randall, members of the Other Suppression Force (OSF) who are tasked to defend New Himuka from creatures known as the Others. While they are equipped with short-range weapons like a sword, both Yuito and Kasane possess the ability of psychokinesis, allowing them to hurl objects and debris at hostile enemies. The protagonist's powers can be upgraded through accessing the "brain map", which serves as the game's skill tree. As players progress, they encounter different party members who assist them in combat. Each companion has their own unique combat abilities, which can then be acquired by the protagonists through an ability named "brain link".

Story
The game is set in both the near future and an alternate reality where humanity has developed technology and formed a society based on the substances found in human brains. These substances also grant humans extrasensory superpowers. The Other Suppression Force (OSF) recruits members with supernatural abilities to protect humanity from the Others - mindless mutants which descend from the Extinction Belt to feast on human brains.

The story is played through the perspectives of two playable OSF members: Yuito Sumeragi and Kasane Randall. Both of them pass the OSF exam and carry out training exercises and early missions with their separate platoons. Eventually, Yuito, Kasane, and their platoon members are called to assist with a situation in the Abandoned Subway. However, during the mission, Kasane's sister Naomi receives a precognition in which her sister is shot with a bullet that'll metamorphose her into an Other. To counteract this, Naomi shoves Kasane aside and takes the shot, transforming into an Other in her place. Naomi is then transported away by agents of Seiran, another settlement outside of New Himuka with an OSF branch. Nagi - Yuito's best friend - becomes traumatized after witnessing Naomi's metamorphosis and is taken away for 'Personality Rehabilitation,' an experimental treatment that not only causes him to forget this event altogether, but also enhances his psionic abilities and causes his mental state to rapidly decline.

Kasane and Yuito attempt to chase down Naomi and her kidnappers. During their pursuit, they run into Karen Travers, an OSF member who distrusts New Himuka and swears the two to secrecy. Karen plans to rebel against New Himuka alongside the city of Seiran.

Yuito and Kasane are called alongside their respective platoons to Kunad Highway. Kasane witnesses another person transform into an Other and suspects that New Himuka was responsible for her sister's metamorphosis. Nagi also arrives on the scene. But due to his personality rehabilitation, he flies into a rage and kills his platoon captain in the process. The murder of Nagi and Yuito's platoon leader causes Kasane's psionic abilities to lose control, resonating with Yuito's powers and forming the Kunad Gate, a dimension akin to a black hole. In the Kunad Gate, Yuito and Kasane witness the assassination of New Himuka's founder, Yakumo Sumeragi.

Due to the influence of the Red Strings, Kasane and her platoon are propelled 50 years into the future, where she meets Yuito's future self. Here, Yuito explains that the more he uses his powers, the more the Kunad Gate will envelop the world in the present and doom humanity, and that the only way to prevent such a calamity is to kill him. It is also explained that Yuito and Kasane's psychokinetic powers are actually called 'gravikinesis' - the psionic ability to travel through time. Yuito sacrifices himself to provoke a reaction from Kasane and cause her to use her gravikinesis to return to present-day New Himuka.

Shortly after Kasane and her platoon are transported back to their present time, Karen disables New Himuka's defense system and allows the Others to attack the city as a precursor for his rebellion. At the same time, Yuito arrives just in time to see his father Joe Sumeragi murdered, with Kasane hovering over the body as if she were the culprit. Kasane heeds the instructions of Yuito's future self and attempts to kill Yuito in order to prevent the Kunad Gate from expanding any further. The battle immediately stops when Karen officially announces his rebellion, causing both platoons to retreat and be sent in different directions.

Yuito's platoon journey to the Old OSF Hospital where they discover that New Himuka has been conducting numerous inhumane experiments in order to create an army of Others, as well as brainwash patients via personality rehabilitation to prevent the truth from being learned. New Himuka wants to weaponize Others for battle and destroy the Extinction Belt. Yuito also learns he was born as a 'dud,' a person without psychokinetic powers, and therefore underwent experiments that artificially provided him with his current abilities. 

Kasane's platoon joins Seiran's rebellion in hopes of killing Yuito to close the Kunad Gate. It's revealed that Seiran is also experimenting on Others and keep them nourished with human brains. In the process, they found a way to temporarily restore an Other's senses. Additionally, they're attempting to find a way to revert Others back into humans. This includes Kasane's sister Naomi. Seiran holds Naomi in their facility as leverage to ensure Kasane's continued support. 

Soon, both platoons respectively travel through Hieno Mountain to reach Togetsu in order to learn the purpose of their existence. It is revealed that Togetsu's inhabitants, the 'Design Children,' desire to return to the moon by using the Red Strings. Kasane and Kyoka were among the Design Children, artificially-created humans with specific objectives. Kyoka was designed for the purpose of observing the late Red Strings user Wakana Sumeragi, Yuito's mother. However, over time, Kyoka eventually developed her own personality and began to act on her own free will. The Design Children attempt to capture Yuito and Kasane in order to enact their plan to return to the moon, but both platoons assist each other and escape. They all exchange the clues and information they find.

Later, Yuito's platoon return to New Himuka to request an audience with his brother Kaito. However, they are stopped by Nagi, whose recent personality rehabilitation causes him to fall into madness. In the battle, Nagi's brain is irreparably damaged and causes him to die in the process. Yuito and his platoon proceed to have their audience with Kaito and try to convince him to believe what they learned from Togetsu. However, Kaito rejects the information and reveals that the government wants to enact revenge on the people of the moon, and that they're willing to use the civilians as a means to an end.

Kasane's platoon go to Mizuhagawa, where Others are being deployed by Seiran and allowed to let loose. In the onslaught, Naomi appears and sacrifices her life to protect Kasane and her platoon. Karen also appears in time to witness the death of another Other, whom he dubs Alice. He then forcefully copies Kasane's Red Strings ability and flees.

Now abreast with the dynamics between the warring states of New Himuka and Seiran, Yuito's platoon utilizes the supercomputer Arahabaki to distribute the newfound evidence amongst New Himuka's civilians, warning them that they're primed to become sacrificial lambs for the government's revenge mission against the moon. Karen appears and copies Yuito's Red Strings ability. This transpires Karen's main objective: to save Alice, an OSF comrade who was metamorphosed into an Other during a mission. He teamed up with Seiran for the sole purpose of restoring Alice to her human form. To achieve this, Karen needed to copy Yuito and Kasane's Red Strings to time travel and prevent her metamorphosis, but failed every attempt.

Later, both platoons deliberate on a plan to close the Kunad Gate without killing Yuito. First, they attempt to return to Togetsu to access their supercomputer archive, BABE. However, upon arrival, BABE shuts down. They soon realize that there may still be one person who holds the key to closing the Kunad Gate: Wakana. Kasane uses her Red Strings to meet up with Wakana on the day she died and bring her to the present day. Yuito and Kasane learn from Wakana that BABE's shutdown was actually an importation of Red Strings research to past users, including herself. Wakana instructs the two to enter the Chronos Terminal and unravel any entanglements, any trace of people who journeyed through time. Afterwards, Wakana reveals that she herself is an entanglement and that her death will erase any trace of the entanglement she created when she traveled to the present with Kasane. She returns to her time and lives out her last few moments before being killed by Togetsu.

However, despite their efforts, the Kunad Gate remains unclosed. The platoons find out that Karen is the last entanglement. Karen travelled 2,000 years into the past and assassinated Yakumo Sumeragi. That in turn caused this version of Karen to become linked with Arahabaki whilst in cold sleep, absorbing its knowledge and power. As such, Yuito, Kasane, and both of their respective platoons traverse through the Sumeragi Tomb to plead with Karen to unravel the last entanglement in order to close the Kunad Gate. Karen rejects their plea and plans to travel back in time one last time to save Alice from being metamorphosed into an Other. The group defeats Karen, and he finally agrees to assist them in closing the Kunad Gate. Using the combined powers of Arahabaki and all Red Strings users, everyone is able to draw the Extinction Belt into the Kunad Gate and eliminate them both forever. However, before they can celebrate, Karen copies the Red Strings power once more and makes one final leap through time, rewriting history and saving Alice in the process.

Much later, everyone pays their respects to Karen and go their separate ways to achieve their own goals.

Development
Scarlet Nexus was co-developed by Bandai Namco Studios and Tose. Keita Iizuka is the game's producer while Kenji Anabuki served as the game's director, both of whom have worked on the Tales series. According to Iizuka, the term "Scarlet Nexus" means "red connection" or "red bond". Therefore, "objects or persons connected with red lines represent a big part in the visuals and key art" of the game. Artist Masakazu Yamashiro combined organic lifeforms and mechanical elements together in order to create unique design for the Others, the protagonists' enemies. In the game, while the Others invade merely to consume human brains, humanity has already developed a system to forecast their invasion. Game director Kenji Anabuki compared them to natural disasters that humans need to co-exist with. Given the game's theme, story and setting, Bandai Namco called Scarlet Nexus a "brain punk" game.

It was first announced during Microsoft's "Xbox 20/20" digital event, which took place on May 7, 2020. The game has been released for PlayStation 4, PlayStation 5, Windows, Xbox One and Xbox Series X/S on June 25, 2021.

The game was promoted with the release of SN-related apparel on Bandai Namco's online store, which was released on June 25, 2021. The animation scenes are produced by Sunrise. The game's theme song is "Dream In Drive" by The Oral Cigarettes, who would later perform the TV series' opening themes, "Red Criminal" and "MACHINEGUN".

Related media

On March 18, 2021, an anime television series adaptation produced by Sunrise was announced and licensed by Funimation outside of Asia. Medialink and Madman Entertainment licensed the anime in the Asia-Pacific region. Hiroyuki Nishimura directed the series and Yōichi Katō, Toshizo Nemoto and Akiko Inoue wrote the series' scripts, with Nishimura and Yuji Ito designing the characters, and Hironori Anazawa composing the series' music. The series aired from July 1 to December 23, 2021.

Reception

Scarlet Nexus received "generally favorable reviews" according to review aggregator Metacritic.

Particular praise was given to the game's combat systems, particularly the telekinesis powers of the two protagonists. IGN Mitchell Saltzman wrote that "what really makes Scarlet Nexus's combat stand out is how the telekinetic moves flow with the weapon-based attacks. At any point of a weapon combo, you can press the right trigger to immediately hop back and throw an object, then follow that with a weapon attack that brings you right back into melee range. The result of the ease of transition between the two is a really exciting and smooth mix of long-range and close-range combat." NME Jon Bailes agreed, arguing that the game introduced new gameplay mechanics in an accessible way, and that it "build[s] slowly towards something very special. I took early satisfaction from the pendulum rhythm of sword attacks and telekinesis throws – you can suck a car or girder into your gravitational control while swiping away, step back to launch it, then lunge forward again to continue your assault. That satisfaction bloomed into a deeper thrill when I found I could trigger powers in this sequence without breaking stride, returning to strike with fire on my sword, and began to anticipate enemy responses, mixing in evasive manoeuvres. Complexity here is flexibility and dynamism." Kotaku Ari Notis also wrote that "Though I thought I knew what it was all about, Scarlet Nexus has consistently surprised me at every turn. Even though I played the demo—which showcased some of the various powers you could activate in combat—I did not expect combat to be as deep and varied as it is."

Critics considered the optional side-quests to be a weak-point for the game overall, not meeting the standard of the main story quests. GamesRadar Hirun Cryer criticised them, writing that "Scarlet Nexus has an abundance of side missions, the vast majority of which sadly fall into the "fetch mission" category of "go here, kill this", or "keep an eye out for X amount of an item"." Polygon George Yang also criticised the side-quests for failing to take advantage of the game's "rich lore and politics" as "there are themes of classism, ableism, and discrimination in the game that could have been explored even further for more world-building." Yang concurred with Cryer that the game's side-quests were "literally all fetch quests. NPCs will ask you to kill a certain enemy in a specific way, then offer you a reward after you report the task as finished. These rewards aren't really even worthwhile anyway, as you can find, purchase, or exchange materials for many of them in the game's shop." However, he wrote in conclusion that "Scarlet Nexus has a colorful cast of characters and an impressive variety of gameplay mechanics, but for me, the unexpected cherry on top was its story. The chapters are very well-paced, and none of them overstays its welcome."

Scarlet Nexus was nominated for Best Role Playing Game at The Game Awards 2021, but lost to Tales of Arise, another game from Bandai Namco Entertainment.

Sales
The PlayStation 4 version of Scarlet Nexus sold 20,160 physical copies during its first week on sale in Japan, making it the fifth best selling retail game of the week in the country. The PlayStation 5 version sold 11,008 copies throughout the same week in Japan, making it the country's ninth bestselling retail game of the week. Scarlet Nexus was the fifth best-selling game of June 2021 in the US, and was also the sixth best-selling game on both the Xbox and PlayStation charts that month.

By April 2022, the game had sold 1 million units and reached 2 million players.

References

External links
  
  
  

2021 video games
Action role-playing video games
Bandai Namco games
Hack and slash role-playing games
PlayStation 4 games
PlayStation 5 games
Science fiction video games
Single-player video games
Unreal Engine games
Video games about cyborgs
Video games about psychic powers
Video games about robots
Video games developed in Japan
Video games featuring female protagonists
Video games featuring protagonists of selectable gender
Video games adapted into television shows
Video games set in 2020
Video games set in the 21st century
Video games set in the future
Windows games
World War III video games
Xbox One games
Xbox Series X and Series S games